The discography of the  Japanese rock band Field of View consists of five studio albums, two DVDs and twenty-two singles.

Studio albums

Compilation albums

Singles

view

Field of View

the Field of View

DVD

References

Discographies of Japanese artists
Pop music group discographies